The South Bend–Mishawaka Metropolitan Statistical Area, sometimes referred to as Michiana, as defined by the United States Census Bureau, is an area consisting of two counties – one in northern Indiana (St. Joseph) and one in southwest Michigan (Cass), anchored by the cities of South Bend and Mishawaka in Indiana. As of the 2010 census, the MSA had a population of 319,224 (though a July 1, 2019 estimate placed the population at 318,192).

Counties
St. Joseph County, Indiana
Cass County, Michigan

Communities

Places with more than 100,000 inhabitants
South Bend, Indiana (Principal city)

Places with 50,000 to 100,000 inhabitants
Mishawaka, Indiana (Principal city)

Places with 1,000 to 50,000 inhabitants
Cassopolis, Michigan
Dowagiac, Michigan
Edwardsburg, Michigan
Georgetown, Indiana (census-designated place)
Granger, Indiana (census-designated place)
Gulivoire Park, Indiana (census-designated place)
Marcellus, Michigan
New Carlisle, Indiana
Niles, Michigan (partial)
North Liberty, Indiana
Osceola, Indiana
Walkerton, Indiana

Places with less than 1,000 inhabitants
Indian Village, Indiana
Lakeville, Indiana
Roseland, Indiana
Vandalia, Michigan

Unincorporated places
Colburn, Indiana
Crumstown, Indiana
La Grange, Michigan
Notre Dame, Indiana
Penn, Michigan
Pleasant Valley, Indiana
Pokagon, Michigan
Sumnerville, Michigan
Union, Michigan
Westfield, Indiana
Wyatt, Indiana

Townships

St. Joseph County

Clay Township
German Township
Greene Township
Harris Township
Liberty Township
Lincoln Township
Madison Township
Olive Township
Penn Township
Portage Township
Union Township
Warren Township

Cass County

 Calvin Township
 Howard Township
 Jefferson Township
 LaGrange Township
 Marcellus Township
 Mason Township
 Milton Township
 Newberg Township
 Ontwa Township
 Penn Township
 Pokagon Township
 Porter Township
 Silver Creek Township
 Volinia Township
 Wayne Township

Demographics

As of the census of 2000, there were 316,663 people, 120,419 households, and 81,096 families residing within the MSA. The racial makeup of the MSA was 83.46% White, 10.59% African American, 0.43% Native American, 1.21% Asian, 0.04% Pacific Islander, 2.27% from other races, and 2.00% from two or more races. Hispanic or Latino of any race were 4.35% of the population.

The median income for a household in the MSA was $40,842, and the median income for a family was $48,277. Males had a median income of $36,311 versus $24,918 for females. The per capita income for the MSA was $19,615.

Combined Statistical Area

The South Bend–Elkhart–Mishawaka Combined Statistical Area is made up of six counties – four in northern Indiana and two in southwest Michigan. The statistical area includes two metropolitan areas and two micropolitan areas. As of the 2020 Census, the CSA had a population of 812,199.

Metropolitan Statistical Areas (MSAs)
South Bend–Mishawaka (St. Joseph County, Indiana and Cass County, Michigan)
Elkhart–Goshen (Elkhart County, Indiana)
Niles (Berrien County, Michigan)
Micropolitan Statistical Areas (μSAs)
Plymouth (Marshall County, Indiana)
Warsaw (Kosciusko County, Indiana)

Transportation

The South Bend-Mishawaka Metropolitan Area is served by two main transit corporations; South Bend Transpo and the Interurban Trolley. TRANSPO services downtown South Bend, the local South Bend station, South Bend International Airport, and the South Shore Line station. The trolley makes connection with TRANSPO in downtown Mishawaka while providing transportation to residents of Elkhart, Indiana and Goshen, Indiana as well.

See also
Michiana
Indiana census statistical areas

References

 
Indiana census statistical areas